NGC 4699 is an intermediate spiral galaxy located in the constellation Virgo. It is located at a distance of circa 65 million light years from Earth, which, given its apparent dimensions, means that NGC 4699 is about 85,000 light years across. It was discovered by William Herschel in 1786. It is a member of the NGC 4699 Group of galaxies, which is a member of the Virgo II Groups, a series of galaxies and galaxy clusters strung out from the southern edge of the Virgo Supercluster.

Characteristics 
NGC 4699 is a Seyfert like galaxy with very weak nuclear emission. The galaxy features a bar that is 0.41 arcminutes long and a ring with diameter 1.95 arcminutes. The galaxy features a large bulge which accounts for the 11.3% of the stellar mass of the galaxy and a large disky pseudobulge, which is larger than the strong bar. The disk within the bulge features tightly wrapped spiral arms. There are a lot of HII regions in the disk. The galaxy has an extended type-III outer disk, with low central surface magnitude and which is thicker than the inner disk.

Supernovae 
Two supernovae have been observed in NGC 4699, SN 1948A and SN 1983K. SN 1983K was a type II supernova with plateau-shaped light curve. The spectra of the supernova featured a progressive violet swift, which was explained by the presence of a proexisting outer shell of materials around the progenitor of the supernova.

Nearby galaxies 
NGC 4699 belongs in the NGC 4697 group according to Makarov and Karachentsev. Other members of the group include NGC 4697, NGC 4674, NGC 4700, NGC 4731, NGC 4742, NGC 4775, NGC 4781, NGC 4784, NGC 4790, NGC 4813, NGC 4948 and NGC 4958. It belongs to the Virgo II groups, an extension of the Virgo Cluster.

Gallery

References

External links 

Intermediate spiral galaxies
Virgo (constellation)
4699
UGCA objects
43321